Ereta Peak is the peak rising to 2280 m at the north extremity of Bastien Range in Ellsworth Mountains, Antarctica.  It has steep and partly ice-free north and southwest slopes, and surmounts upper Nimitz Glacier to the southeast.

The peak is named after the Thracian town of Ereta in Northeastern Bulgaria.

Location
US mapping in 1961 and 1988.

See also
 Mountains in Antarctica

Maps
 Vinson Massif.  Scale 1:250 000 topographic map.  Reston, Virginia: US Geological Survey, 1988.
 Antarctic Digital Database (ADD). Scale 1:250000 topographic map of Antarctica. Scientific Committee on Antarctic Research (SCAR). Since 1993, regularly updated.

Notes

References
 Ereta Peak. SCAR Composite Gazetteer of Antarctica.
 Bulgarian Antarctic Gazetteer. Antarctic Place-names Commission. (details in Bulgarian, basic data in English)

External links
 Ereta Peak. Copernix satellite image

Ellsworth Mountains
Bulgaria and the Antarctic
Mountains of Ellsworth Land